Jan Stejskal (born 14 February 1997) is a Czech football player who plays for SK Slavia Prague as a goalkeeper.

Club career
On youth level he played for FK Pardubice.

On 1 July 2015 he moved to FC Hradec Králové in the Czech First League. Since then he played for the first team just in 3 matches in the Czech Cup. He scored equalizer goal in 90. minute in the match against Spartak Slatiňany in the first round in 2018-19 Czech Cup.

On 1 July 2016 he was loaned back to Pardubice in the Czech National Football League. In six months long loan he played in 1 match in the Czech Cup.

On 18 July 2017 he was loaned to SK Převýšov in the Bohemian Football League. In six months long loan he played in 6 league matches and in 1 match in the Czech Cup.

On 22 February 2018 he was loaned to Olympia Prague in Czech National Football League. In four months long loan he played in 13 league matches.

On 10 January 2019 he was loaned to FK Mladá Boleslav in Czech First League. In one year long loan he played in 1 league match for the first team and one league match for the reserve team (playing in the Bohemian Football League). On 1 January 2020 he moved to Mladá Boleslav on permanent basis. He played in 13 league matches for the first team.

On 9 September 2020 he was loaned to the Czech First League champion SK Slavia Prague. In four months long loan he did not play in any match. On 14 January 2021 he moved to Slavia Prague on permanent basis. He made his debut for the first team in the Czech Cup match against Dukla Prague on 19 January 2021.

International career
He had played international football at under-16, 17, 18, 19 and 21 level for Czech Republic U16, Czech Republic U17, Czech Republic U18, Czech Republic U19 and Czech Republic U21. He played in 23 matches.

Honours

 SK Slavia Prague
Czech First League: 2020–21
Czech Cup: 2020–21

External links
 Jan Stejskal at fotbal.cz
 

1997 births
Living people
Czech footballers
Czech Republic under-21 international footballers
Czech Republic youth international footballers
Association football goalkeepers
SK Slavia Prague players
FC Hradec Králové players
FK Pardubice players
FK Mladá Boleslav players
Czech First League players
Czech National Football League players
Sportspeople from Pardubice